William Gerald Knox Boswell (24 June 1892 – 28 July 1916) was an English first-class cricketer and British Army officer.

The son of William Albert Boswell and Florence Helen Rotch, he was born at Chelsea in June 1892. He was educated at Eton College, before going up to New College, Oxford. While studying at Oxford, Boswell played first-class cricket for Oxford University, making his debut against the Free Foresters at Oxford in 1912. He played first-class cricket for Oxford until 1914, making fourteen appearances. He scored a total of 756 runs in his fourteen matches, at an average of 30.24. His high score of 101 not out, which was his only first-class century, came against Hampshire in 1913. With the ball, he took 14 wickets at a bowling average of 24.50 and best figures of 4 for 22.

Boswell served in the British Army during the First World War, being commissioned as a second lieutenant with the Rifle Brigade in August 1914, with confirmation in the rank coming in January 1915. He was promoted to lieutenant in July 1915, while in October 1915 he was made a temporary captain. Boswell died from wounds received in action at Thiepval during the Battle of the Somme on 28 July 1916.

References

External links

1892 births
1916 deaths
Alumni of New College, Oxford
British Army personnel of World War I
British military personnel killed in the Battle of the Somme
Cricketers from Chelsea, London
English cricketers
Oxford University cricketers
People educated at Eton College
Rifle Brigade officers
Military personnel from London